Sünde (German for "sin") is the third album by German rock band Eisbrecher, released on 22 August 2008 in Germany and on 26 August in the United States. The limited edition comes as a digipak and includes three bonus tracks (one new song and two remixes).

Track list 
 "Kann denn Liebe Sünde sein?" (Can Love Be a Sin?) – 4:50
 "Alkohol" (Alcohol) – 4:04
 "Komm süßer Tod" (Come Sweet Death) – 4:36
 "Heilig" (Holy) – 4:46
 "Verdammt sind" (Are Damned) (instrumental) – 1:43
 "Die durch die Hölle gehen" (Those Going Through Hell) – 3:54
 "Herzdieb" (Heart Thief) – 4:27
 "1000 Flammen" (1000 Flames) – 4:13
 "This is Deutsch" (This Is German) – 4:25
 "Zu sterben" (To Die) – 5:19
 "Mehr Licht" (More Light) – 4:30
 "Kuss" (Kiss) (instrumental) – 4:21
 "Blut und Tränen"  (Blood and Tears) – 5:06
 "This is Deutsch" (SITD remix)  – 4:42
 "Alkohol" (Rotersand Remix) – 5:08
 "Kann denn Liebe Sünde sein?" (SITD remix) – 4:04

Tracks 13, 15 and 16 are only on limited and American re-issues.

Personnel 
 Alexander Wesselsky – vocals
 Noel Pix – instruments
 Max Schauer – keyboards and programming, tracks 5, 8 and 13; additional programming on tracks 2 and 3
 Eric Damköhler – guitars on track 9; additional guitars on tracks 1 and 6

Charting 
 European Top 100 Albums charts - #62
 Media Control Charts - #18
 Deutsche Alternative Charts - #1

References

Eisbrecher albums
2008 albums
AFM Records albums
Metropolis Records albums
German-language albums